Hamelin Trelawny (16 October 1782 – 3 May 1846) was a British politician that served as governor of Saint Helena. Born to nobility, he would enlist in the British military in 1798, rising to the rank of colonel by 1841. He was appointed Governor of Saint Helena on 24 August 1841, serving in the position until his death.

Early life
Hamelin was born to Sir Harry Trelawny, 7th Baronet and Anne Browne (died 18 November 1822). He had 5 siblings:

John Trelawney (28 January 1780 – 31 October 1821)
Sir William Salusbury-Trelawny, 8th Baronet (4 July 1781 – 15 November 1856)
Colonel Jonathan Trelawny (30 August 1786 – 13 September 1855)
Anne Letitia (22 January 1779 – 6 July 1860)
Mary Harding (died 1857)

Military service
Hamelin entered into the service of the Royal Regiment of Artillery in 1798, serving in Holland the following year. He later served in the Peninsular War between 1813 and 1814. He served as captain of the regiment's A Battery, 14th Brigade between 1826 and 1831. Following this, he was promoted to the position of lieutenant-colonel on 27 June 1831; Second Captain Thomas Grantham was promoted to captain as a result.

On 27 November 1841, Hamelin was promoted to the position of colonel.

Saint Helena
Hamelin was appointed Governor of Saint Helena on 24 August 1841. He assumed the role on 6 January 1842, succeeding Major General George Middlemore. He promptly raised 5 companies in England under the St. Helena Regiment in order to replace the line regiments at Saint Helena. Following his death, he was succeeded by Lieutenant-Colonel G.C Fraser as acting Governor on 4 May 1846, with Sir Patrick Ross assuming the role of Governor on 23 November 1846.

Personal life
Hamelin married Martha Rogers (died 6 January 1864) in 1806. They had six children:
Mary Trelawny (m. 5 September 1831, died 10 June 1849)
Mary Matilda 
Agnes Matilda (m. 12 June 1866)
Emily Letitia (m. 1 June 1847, died 16 June 1871)
Jane la Vallin Trelawny (m. 18 December 1842)
Edward Harry Trelawny

He died on 3 May 1846 in Saint Helena. A few days prior to his death, he was paralyzed in his left side.

References

1782 births
1846 deaths
Governors of Saint Helena
People from Pelynt
Trelawny Parish
Royal Artillery soldiers
British Army personnel of the Peninsular War